Ole Devegge (20 October 1772 – 16 January 1847) was a Norwegian librarian, numismatist and collector.

References

1772 births
1847 deaths
Norwegian librarians
Norwegian numismatists